Lonnie J. Sanders, Jr. (born November 6, 1941) is a former American football cornerback in the National Football League for the Washington Redskins and the St. Louis Cardinals.  He played college football at Michigan State University and was drafted in the second round of the 1962 NFL Draft.  Sanders was also selected in the tenth round of the 1963 AFL Draft by the Denver Broncos.

He currently resides with his wife and son in Northwest Washington, D.C.

1941 births
Living people
Players of American football from Detroit
American football cornerbacks
Michigan State Spartans football players
Washington Redskins players
St. Louis Cardinals (football) players